A  breathing set or breathing apparatus is equipment which allows a person to breathe in a hostile environment where breathing would otherwise be impossible or hazardous, and may refer to:

Scuba set, any breathing set that is carried entirely by an underwater diver and provides the diver with breathing gas at the ambient pressure 
Rebreather, a breathing apparatus that absorbs the carbon dioxide and adds oxygen to a user's exhaled breath, allowing unused oxygen and diluent (if present) to be recycled
Surface-supplied diving equipment (SSDE), diving equipment supplied with breathing gas using a diver's umbilical or airline from the surface, such as a boat or platform
Self-contained breathing apparatus (SCBA), used out of water, worn by rescue workers, firefighters and others in contaminated, toxic or hypoxic atmospheres
Space suit, a garment worn to keep a human alive in the harsh environment of outer space, primarily the vacuum and temperature extremes

See also